Neeku Naaku Dash Dash is a 2012 Telugu romantic thriller film directed by Teja is about a student named Siva who is forced to drop out of college to work with liquor mafia, who forces teenagers to work for them. He falls in love with Gayathri, which causes trouble with the mafia, which molds the rest of the story.

Plot
Siva studies in a village stands as a surety for his friend's loan. While the lender comes and asks for money, his friends refuse to return. So Siva had to drop his college and for returning the loan the lender takes him to the nearby town where he had to work under liquor mafia. There he meets Gayathri, they fall in love and Gayathri learns that she is pregnant. Meanwhile, Siva tries to get his mistake (getting Nagaraj killed because of him and his friend Toofan) set right by stealing the money from his owner and at the same time there would be chaos in the building they work. So finally they escape from them and they are then pursued by the Chitti Thalli, Bapineedu and the police.

Cast
Prince as Siva
Nanditha as Gayathri
 MS.Chowdhary as Bapineedu
Suman Setty as Toofan
Teertha as Chitti Thalli
Banerjee
Uttej
Tanikella Bharani
Venky Kudumula
Shruti Reddy in a special appearance in the song 'Boys Boys'

Soundtrack

Reception 
Radhika Rajamani of Rediff.com termed the film "mediocre" and rated 2/5. "Neeku Naaku Dash Dash starts off on a promising note but loses steam in the second half", Rajmani added. The Times of India critic awarded the film  stars out of 5 and stated: "One gets the feeling that director Teja tried to do a little too much with the movie, loading the narrative with multiple emotions all through."

References

External links

2012 films
Indian romantic thriller films
Films directed by Teja (film director)
2010s Telugu-language films
2010s romantic thriller films